Club Deportivo Unión Criptanense–Tierra de Gigantes is a Spanish football team  based in Campo de Criptana, Ciudad Real  in the autonomous community of Castile-La Mancha. The first club was founded in 1925 and disappeared in the 1940s. The current club was founded in 1951. its plays in 1ª Autonómica Preferente. Criptanense's stadium is Estadio Agustín de la Fuente with capacity of 2,500 seats.

Season to season

5 seasons in Tercera División

External links
Futbolme.com profile
Unofficial website
ffcm.es profile

Football clubs in Castilla–La Mancha
Association football clubs established in 1951
Divisiones Regionales de Fútbol clubs
1951 establishments in Spain
Province of Ciudad Real